Batamay is a rural locality (a selo), and one of two settlements in Kirovsky Rural Okrug of Kobyaysky District in the Sakha Republic, Russia, in addition to Segyan-Kyuyol, the administrative center of the Rural Okrug. Its population as of the 2002 Census was 216.

Geography
Batamay is located near the confluence of the Aldan and the Lena River, in the eastern part of the Central Yakutian Plain and south of the Verkhoyansk Range. It lies on the right bank of the Kharyynka River, at its confluence with the Lena.

Climate
Batamai has an extreme subarctic climate. (Köppen Dfd, bordering on Dwd) with extremely cold, long winters and short, warm summers.

References

Notes

Sources
Official website of the Sakha Republic. Registry of the Administrative-Territorial Divisions of the Sakha Republic. Kobyaysky District. 

Rural localities in Kobyaysky District
Populated places on the Lena River
Central Yakutian Lowland